Shanghai Lexicographical Publishing House is a publishing house in mainland China, specialized in publishing reference works. Its precedent was the Ci Hai Editing Institute affiliated to Zhong Hua Book Co. (中华书局辞海编辑所), founded in August, 1958. From January, 1978, it adopted the current name. The Shanghai Lexicographical Publishing House published revised editions of Cihai, a large-scale dictionary and encyclopedia of Standard Mandarin Chinese, in 1979, 1989, 1999, and 2009. As of 2016, it is owned by Shanghai Century Publishing(Group) Co., Ltd. Its ISBN code is 7-5326.

The Publishing House is located on 457 North Shaanxi Rd of Jing'an District of Shanghai.

Subsidiaries
Zhonghua Books Library: Originally established in 1916 within the Zheng An road factory. In 1925, it was renamed to its current name. In 1935, it was moved into the 4th floor of the newly built Macau factory. Between April and June 1978, it was moved to the Ci Hai Editing Institute building at Shanxi North Road, which was later owned by Shanghai Lexicographical Publishing House.

References

External links
 Official website of Shanghai Lexicographical Publishing House

Mass media in Shanghai
Book publishing companies of China
Publishing companies established in 1958
1958 establishments in China